Cedar Grove, California may refer to:
Cedar Grove, El Dorado County, California
Cedar Grove, Fresno County, California